Kim Hyo-Sub (born September 23, 1980) is a male freestyle wrestler from South Korea. He participated in Men's freestyle 55 kg at 2004 Summer Olympics and 2008 Summer Olympics. In 1/8 of final he beat Francisco Sanchez from Spain, but was eliminated in the next round by Namig Sevdimov from Azerbaijan.

External links 
 Wrestler bio on beijing2008.com

Living people
1980 births
Olympic wrestlers of South Korea
Wrestlers at the 2004 Summer Olympics
Wrestlers at the 2008 Summer Olympics
Asian Games medalists in wrestling
Wrestlers at the 2006 Asian Games
Wrestlers at the 2010 Asian Games
South Korean male sport wrestlers
Asian Games bronze medalists for South Korea

Medalists at the 2006 Asian Games
Medalists at the 2010 Asian Games
Sportspeople from Gyeonggi Province
20th-century South Korean people
21st-century South Korean people